Catholic doctrine may refer to:

 Catholic theology
 Catholic moral theology
 Catholic Mariology
Heresy in the Catholic Church
 Catholic social teaching
 Catholic liturgy
Catholic Church and homosexuality
Catholic theology of sexuality
Ten Commandments in Catholic theology